Mohamed Haytham Khayat (1937 – 5 September 2020) was a Syrian physician and lexicographer. He was a senior policy advisor to the World Health Organization Regional Directory for the Eastern Mediterranean, a member of both the Board of Trustees of the International Union of Muslim Scholars, and the Board of Trustees of the Islamic Organization for Medical Sciences. He was known for his major contribution to the Unified Medical Dictionary (UMD).

Khayat was born in Damascus, Syria, in 1937. He was educated at Damascus University, Faculty of Medicine, where he was awarded a Bachelor of Medicine, Bachelor of Surgery in 1959. He has published more than 25 books on medicine, health, chemistry, botany, Arabic language, and Islamic ethics in Arabic, French and English, including some dictionaries. He has also published hundreds of articles in Arabic, French, English, German and Italian in various fields.

He died on 5 September 2020 in Cairo, Egypt.

References

People from Damascus
Syrian physicians
International Union of Muslim Scholars members
Damascus University alumni
1937 births
2020 deaths
World Health Organization officials
Syrian lexicographers
Members of Academy of the Arabic Language in Cairo